The Sony Vaio L series is a range of Vaio all-in-one desktop computers sold by Sony since 2006.

Windows 7 models
Since the launch of Windows 7, the L series has been a touchscreen PC, featuring a 24" 1920x1080 LCD touchscreen. As of 2013, the L series used the Windows 8 operating system.

The Sony Vaio J series is similar to the L series, except that it features a 21.5" 1920x1080 LCD touchscreen.

Specifications

References

 Sony Vaio L series desktop computers come with a 3.5" sized hard disk.

L
All-in-one desktop computers